King Fahd Complex for the Printing of the Holy Qur'an (Arabic: مجمع الملك فهد لطباعة المصحف الشريف) is a  printing plant located in Medina, Saudi Arabia that publishes the Qur'an in Arabic and other languages. 

The company produces about 10 million copies a year. It has 1,700 employees. It has published 55 different translations of the Qur'an in 39 languages. Its website offers the Arabic Qur'an, recitations, textual search, translations, images of early Qur'an manuscripts, and exegetic commentaries. Since 1985, The Complex made over 128 million books of the Qur'an, which is widely used by all sects of Islam. Original copy  was written by calligrapher, Uthman Taha

Production
From 1985, its opening year, until 2007

The King Fahd Complex for the Printing of the Holy Quran produces The Noble Quran, which is  made freely available and is among the most widely read Quran translations in the world.  Both the translation and associated contents have been criticised.

Distribution of collector versions 
The complex began distributing its versions of the Qur’an, recordings, parts, the Yaseen quarter, the last ten days, translations, and books since 1405 AH, and this is done to Muslims inside and outside the Kingdom around the world, and the quantities distributed amounted to hundreds of millions.

See also
 List of things named after Saudi Kings
 Uthman Taha

References

External links
 King Fahd Complex for the Printing of the Holy Qur'an website

1985 establishments in Saudi Arabia
Publishing companies established in 1985
Printing companies
Companies of Saudi Arabia
Quran
Medina
Islamic organisations based in Saudi Arabia
Publishing companies of Asia